Norway competed at the 1980 Winter Olympics in Lake Placid, United States.

Medalists

Alpine skiing

Men

Women

Biathlon

Men

Men's 4 x 7.5 km relay

 1 A penalty loop of 150 metres had to be skied per missed target.
 2 One minute added per close miss (a hit in the outer ring), two minutes added per complete miss.

Cross-country skiing

Men

Men's 4 × 10 km relay

Women

Women's 4 × 5 km relay

Ice hockey

First round - Blue Division

Team roster
Jim Marthinsen
Thore Wålberg
Nils Nilsen
Thor Martinsen
Trond Abrahamsen
Rune Molberg
Øivind Løsåmoen
Erik Pedersen
Øystein Jarlsbo
Håkon Lundenes
Geir Myhre
Morten Johansen
Morten Sethereng
Knut Andresen
Tore Falch Nilsen
Tom Røymark
Vidar Johansen
Petter Thoresen
Knut Fjeldsgaard
Stephen Foyn
Head coach: Ronald Pettersson

Nordic combined 

Events:
 normal hill ski jumping 
 15 km cross-country skiing

Ski jumping

Speed skating

Men

Women

References
 Official Olympic Reports
 International Olympic Committee results database
 Olympic Winter Games 1980, full results by sports-reference.com

Nations at the 1980 Winter Olympics
1980
Olympics